George Norman Barnard (December 23, 1819 – February 4, 1902) was an American photographer most well known for his photographs from the American Civil War era. He is often noted as G. N. Barnard.

Early life

Barnard was born into a farming family in Coventry, Connecticut on December 23, 1819. His father died in 1826 and he grew up with relatives in a nearby town, apprenticing at various jobs in the family owned businesses. He married in 1843 and moved to Oswego, New York, where he briefly got into the hotel business before turning to photography.

Career
Starting his business in New York State in 1843, Barnard was one of the first to use daguerreotype, the first commercially available form of photography, in the United States.

A fire in 1853 destroyed the grain elevators in Oswego, New York, an event Barnard photographed. Historians consider these some of the first "news" photographs. Barnard also photographed Abraham Lincoln's 1861 inauguration.

Civil War

Barnard is best known for American Civil War era photos. He was the official army photographer for the Military Division of the Mississippi, which mostly involved photographing and documenting fortifications, bridges, and documents.

His 1866 book, Photographic Views of Sherman's Campaign, showed the devastation of the war. The book includes 61 albumen prints in Nashville, the Chattanooga Valley, Atlanta, and Savannah. He took the photos while operating under General Sherman's command. The book also includes a studio portrait of Sherman and his generals.

Post-war
After the war, Barnard ran photography studios in Ohio, Charleston, South Carolina and Chicago. His Chicago studio burned down in the 1871 city fire. In Rochester, New York, he briefly worked with George Eastman, the founder of the Eastman Kodak Company.

Collections

Barnard's work is included in the American Memory collection, Selected Civil War Photographs from the Library of Congress, 1861–1865. The J. Paul Getty Museum has one of his works and the MoMA also has his work in their collection.

See also
Photographers of the American Civil War

References

External links

1819 births
1902 deaths
19th-century American photographers
People from Coventry, Connecticut
Photographers from Connecticut